Eric Knittel (born 20 April 1983, in Berlin) is a German rower.

Knittel won the gold medal in the 2009 Rowing World Cup at Lucerne in the men's double sculls with Stephan Krüger.  He also teamed with him at the 2012 Summer Olympics.

Knittel is a member of the Berlin Rowing Club.

References

External links
 
 
 
 
 

1983 births
Living people
Rowers from Berlin
German male rowers
Olympic rowers of Germany
Rowers at the 2012 Summer Olympics
World Rowing Championships medalists for Germany
European Rowing Championships medalists
20th-century German people